Minister for women is a ministerial position in several countries and country subdivisions, including:

 Minister for Women (Australia), several previous names
 Minister for Women (Victoria), minister in the Victorian State Government
 Ministry of Women, Family and Community Development (Malaysia)
 Minister for Women (New Zealand)
 Minister for Women and Equalities (United Kingdom), previously Minister for Women

See also
 Minister for Gender Equality (Denmark)
 Minister for Gender Equality (Sweden)